Yelena Struchayeva (born January 5, 1965, in Almaty) is a Kazakhstani sport shooter. Struchaeva qualified for the women's trap as a 43-year-old at the 2008 Summer Olympics in Beijing, by winning the gold medal from the 2007 Asian Shooting Championships in Kuwait City, Kuwait. She scored a total of 69 points after firing three sets of 25 targets and receiving six misses in the qualifying round of the competition. She added seventeen more shots to obtain a total of 86 points in the final, but missed out of the bronze medal triumph to United States' Corey Cogdell in a four-person shoot-off. In the end, Struchaeva finished the event in sixth place, after losing out in a fifth-place match against Lithuania's Daina Gudzinevičiūtė.

References

External links
NBC 2008 Olympics profile 

Kazakhstani female sport shooters
Living people
Olympic shooters of Kazakhstan
Shooters at the 2008 Summer Olympics
Sportspeople from Almaty
1965 births
Shooters at the 2006 Asian Games
Asian Games competitors for Kazakhstan
21st-century Kazakhstani women